Santelli is an Italian surname. Notable people with the surname include:

Anthony Santelli, Italian-Canadian magazine editor
Giorgio Santelli, Italian fencer (1897-1985)
Italo Santelli, Italian fencer (1866-1945)
Paul Santelli, French flying ace
Rick Santelli (born 1956), on-air reporter for CNBC financial news network

Italian-language surnames